CHCN-FM was a community radio station that broadcast at 106.9 FM in Cole Harbour, Nova Scotia, Canada.

Owned by the Cole Harbour Community Radio Society, the station was originally granted a licence by the Canadian Radio-television and Telecommunications Commission in 2000, but faced some initial delays getting on the air. The station was granted licence amendments in 2001 to change its transmitter location and to extend the time limit on its planned launch date.

The licence was subsequently revoked in 2003 at the station's request.  The licence was reinstated in 2010.

CHCN-FM has not broadcast on 106.9 since 2012. The fate of the station is not known. As of October 7, 2014 the frequency remains open.

References

HCN-FM
Radio stations in Halifax, Nova Scotia
HCN-FM
Radio stations established in 2000 
Radio stations disestablished in 2003
2000 establishments in Nova Scotia 
2003 disestablishments in Nova Scotia